Kuo Kuo-wen (born 11 March 1967) or Robert Kuo is a Taiwanese politician. He has served as secretary-general of the Taiwan Confederation of Trade Unions and Taiwan Labor Front, as well as a member of the Tainan City Council. He was appointed deputy minister of labor in 2016, and left the position in 2017. He was elected to the Legislative Yuan in March 2019.

Education
Kuo Kuo-wen, also known by the English name Robert Kuo, was born on 11 March 1967. He obtained his master's degree in law from National Taiwan University and doctoral degree in political economy from National Cheng Kung University.

Activism

Political career
In May 2016, he was appointed the deputy minister of labor, and vacated his seat on the Tainan City Council to take the post. In September 2017, he left his position at the labor ministry, citing personal reasons. Considered a potential candidate for the 2020 legislative election, Kuo instead contested a March 2019 legislative by-election in Tainan for the open seat of Huang Wei-cher, and defeated four other candidates. Kuo won the election, though he finished less than three percent ahead of his closest challenger, Kuomintang candidate , in a district that has been considered a stronghold for the Democratic Progressive Party. Kuo was sworn in as a member of the Legislative Yuan on 21 March 2019. He won a full legislative term in 2020, facing Kuomintang candidate .

References

1967 births
Living people
Government ministers of Taiwan
National Taiwan University alumni
National Cheng Kung University alumni
Members of the 9th Legislative Yuan
Democratic Progressive Party Members of the Legislative Yuan
Tainan Members of the Legislative Yuan
Taiwanese trade union leaders
Tainan City Councilors
Members of the 10th Legislative Yuan